The 2010–11 Auburn Tigers men's basketball team represented Auburn University in the 2010–11 NCAA Division I men's basketball season. This season marked a new era for the school in more than one respect. It was the first year of the Tony Barbee era of Auburn basketball. Barbee replaced ousted coach Jeff Lebo who was fired after a 15–17 (6–10) season. Also, the Tigers left their home since the middle of the 1968–69 season, Beard–Eaves–Memorial Coliseum, and moved into the new Auburn Arena.

Schedule and results

|-
!colspan=8 style=| Exhibition
|-

|-
!colspan=8 style=| Regular season

|-
!colspan=8 style=| SEC tournament

Source: 2010-11 Auburm Tigers basketball schedule

References

Auburn Tigers men's basketball seasons
Auburn Tigers Mens Basketball Team, 2010-11
Auburn
Auburn